São Tomé and Príncipe competed at the 2020 Summer Olympics in Tokyo. Originally scheduled to take place from 24 July to 9 August 2020, the Games have been postponed to 23 July to 8 August 2021, because of the COVID-19 pandemic. It was the nation's seventh consecutive appearance at the Summer Olympics.

Competitors
The following is the list of number of competitors in the Games.

Athletics

São Tomé and Príncipe received a universality slot from the World Athletics to send a female track and field athlete to the Olympics.

Track & road events

Canoeing

Sprint
São Tomé and Príncipe qualified a single boat (men's C-2 1000 m) for the Games by winning the gold medal at the 2019 African Games in Rabat, Morocco.

Qualification Legend: FA = Qualify to final (medal); FB = Qualify to final B (non-medal)

References

Nations at the 2020 Summer Olympics
2020
2021 in São Tomé and Príncipe